Sirius B is part of the Sirius binary star system.

Sirius B may also refer to:
Sirius B (album), a 2004 album by Therion
Sirius.B (band), a musical group from Asheville, North Carolina

See also
Sirius (disambiguation)